Iván Jiménez Villalba (born 11 October 1991), commonly known as Maqui, is a Spanish footballer. He plays for Arcos CF as a midfielder.

Club career
Born in Arcos de la Frontera, Province of Cádiz, Jiménez finished his formation with Xerez CD, making his debuts as a senior with the reserves in 2010–11 season, representing the side in Primera Andaluza (fifth level).

Jiménez made his official debut for the Andalusians' first team on 3 June 2012, playing the last 24 minutes in a 0–6 home loss against FC Barcelona B.

On 10 July 2013 Jiménez signed with CF Pobla de Mafumet, in Tercera División. After appearing in 16 matches during the campaign, he moved to hometown's Arcos CF also in the fourth level.

References

External links
 
 Futbolme profile  
 

1991 births
Living people
Spanish footballers
Footballers from Andalusia
Association football midfielders
Segunda División players
Tercera División players
Xerez CD B players
Xerez CD footballers
CF Pobla de Mafumet footballers